Fatih Ceylan (born 25 November 1980) is a Turkish professional footballer who last played as a left winger for 1. CfR Pforzheim.

Honours 
 Kayserispor
Turkish Cup (1): 2008

References

1980 births
Living people
People from Düzce
Turkish footballers
Turkish expatriate footballers
Süper Lig players
Sakaryaspor footballers
Kayserispor footballers
Antalyaspor footballers
Kardemir Karabükspor footballers
Denizlispor footballers
Expatriate footballers in Germany
Association football midfielders